Arthur Browning (born 22 September 1944) is a former speedway rider from England.

Speedway career 
Browning rode in the top two tiers of British Speedway from 1972 to 1982, riding for various clubs. He was instrumental in helping the Birmingham Brummies to win two league titles during the 1974 British League Division Two season and 1975 New National League season.

References 

Living people
1944 births
British speedway riders
Birmingham Brummies riders
Scunthorpe Scorpions riders
Sheffield Tigers riders
Stoke Potters riders
Wolverhampton Wolves riders